Dimnøya, also called Dimna an island in Ulstein Municipality in Møre og Romsdal county, Norway. The island had 1,398 residents in 2014.

The club is best known for its sports team Dimna IL, the club of athlete Karsten Warholm.

See also
List of islands of Norway

References

Ulstein
Islands of Møre og Romsdal